Manton is both a surname and an uncommon given name of English and Irish origins. It is derived from various place names throughout England, while in Ireland it is the anglicized form of the Gaelic "Ó Manntáin", or "descendant of Manntán", a personal name derived from a diminutive of "manntach" ("toothless"). Notable persons with the name include:

Surname
Rev. David Manton (born 1936), Australian Uniting Church minister
Irene Manton (1904-1988), British botanist
James Thomas Manton (1812–1899), surveyor in Australia's Northern Territory
Jonathan Manton, Australian engineer
Joseph Manton (1766-1835), English gun maker
Martin T. Manton (1880-1946), U.S. Circuit Court Judge
Nicholas Manton (born 1952), British mathematical physicist
Sidnie Milana Manton (1902-1979), British entomologist
Thomas J. Manton (1932-2006), American congressman (was of Irish ancestry)
Thomas Manton (1620-1677), English Puritan theologian

Given name
Manton Eddy (1892-1962), Lieutenant General of the United States Army

References